Şevket Altuğ (born 13 March 1943) is a Turkish actor.

Altuğ was born in Bandırma and grew up in İstanbul where he studied at Galatasaray High School. He began his theatre career in 1962 and worked continuously for five years at AEG. He married fellow theatre actress Jale Altuğ in 1971 and became the father of two children.

Altuğ acted in many cinema films in the 1970s and 1980s including Kapıcılar Kralı, Meraklı Köfteci, Aile Şerefi, Hasip ile Nasip, Mağlup Edilemeyenler, Şabanoğlu Şaban, Gülen Gözler, Hababam Sınıfı Dokuz Doğuruyor, Düşman, Dolap Beygiri, Yedi Bela Hüsnü, Şekerpare and Tokatçı. After making his television debut in Seyehatname, he did the part of Şakir in the comedy series Perihan Abla. Beginning in 1993, he played the lead role of Fikret ("Fiko") in Süper Baba which became one of the popular and beloved television series in Turkey.

Filmography

References

External links 
 

1943 births
Living people
People from Balıkesir
Turkish male film actors
Turkish male stage actors
Turkish male television actors